Aaron Hall (born 9 November 1990) is an Australian rules footballer who plays for the North Melbourne Football Club in the Australian Football League (AFL).

Early life
Hall was born in Hobart to a Fijian mother and an Australian father. His mother, Naz, moved to Australia in 1983 as she won a scholarship to study in Tasmania. His father, Dale, was a Hobart Football Club premiership player in 1990 Tasmanian Football League and was drafted by the Sydney Swans in the 1990 AFL Draft as a 21-year-old. Dale played six reserves games and three Ansett Cup games in the seniors but did not play any AFL games for the Swans. While at Sydney he also played for Campbelltown in the Sydney Football League. Dale would return home to Hobart where he led the Southern Football League (Tasmania) goalkicking in 1999.

As a child Aaron grew up wanting to be an AFL player like his father. Aaron had explosive speed and  however despite his short stature. In grade 10 he was only 157 cm tall and during his 18th year he grew 13 cm in three months resulting in growing pains. Remarkably by the age of 19 Hall would grow to 186 cm, taller than his father Dale who was 183 cm.

Originally from the Hobart Football Club in the Tasmanian State League, the same club as his father, Hall did not play underage football for Tasmania like most AFL prospects from the state. He played alongside future AFL player Jeremy Howe in 2010.

Hall was recruited to the Gold Coast Suns as a 21-year-old in the 2012 Pre-season Draft, with pick number 7.

AFL career

2012 
Hall made his AFL debut in round 1, in 2012, against  he had 17 disposals in a 69-point loss. Hall played the first 4 games of the season as a small forward but was dropped to the NEAFL after a poor game in wet conditions vs Brisbane. Hall came in and out of the team, playing four more games for the season.

2013 
Hall played all of Gold Coasts 22 games in 2013, he averaged 14 disposals a game and kicked 24 goals. Hall's most notable performance was a 5-goal haul vs Hawthorn.

2014 
Hall's career stalled in 2014 as he played 16 games with stints in the NEAFL, he kicked 12 goals and averaged 13 disposals a game.

2015 
Hall's career would come to the crossroads in 2015 after a groin surgery severely restricted his pre-season and a poor start to the season. He started the season in the NEAFL where he amassed 31 touches and two goals in a defeat. This was enough for Hall to come back in the team for Round 3 of the AFL season however Hall would have a minimal impact in round 3 and 4 then would find himself back in the Suns reserves. Once again Hall had 31 disposals in the reserves and found his way back in for round 6. Hall played rounds 4, 5 and 6 but was the sub in round 5 and was subbed out in round 6. Hall didn't even play the next two rounds in the NEAFL, he then played two more NEAFL games before a 29 possession and four goal performance in win would see him return for round 14. Hall was solid for the next 3 games kicking 5 goals but Round 17 would be the turning point in Hall's career

In Round 17 Hall moved to the midfield as the Suns star midfielder Gary Ablett was injured in round 16. Hall took his opportunity, refusing to relinquish his position in Gold Coast's midfield. Across the final seven rounds of the season, Hall equalled or bettered his career-best possession haul on six occasions, averaging 27 possessions, 6 inside 50s and 4 clearances per game during that period. Hall's finish to the season saw him poll in six of the last seven games of the year to finish seventh in the Club Champion. His form was rewarded in September when he signed a 3-year deal with the Suns.

2018 
At the conclusion of the 2018 season, Hall was traded to North Melbourne.

2021

Hall played as a rebounding defender throughout 2021, delivering his career best year. Hall’s good form was rewarded in September 2021 with a contract extension at the Kangaroos for the 2022 AFL season.

Statistics
 Statistics are correct to the end of the round 3 2022

|- style="background-color: #EAEAEA"
! scope="row" style="text-align:center" | 2012
|style="text-align:center;"|
| 33 || 8 || 8 || 5 || 65 || 36 || 101 || 24 || 29 || 1.0 || 0.6 || 8.1 || 4.5 || 12.6 || 3.0 || 3.6 || 1
|-
! scope="row" style="text-align:center" | 2013
|style="text-align:center;"|
| 33 || 22 || 24 || 27 || 214 || 100 || 314 || 73 || 66 || 1.1 || 1.2 || 9.7 || 4.5 || 14.3 || 3.3 || 3.0 || 0
|- style="background-color: #EAEAEA"
! scope="row" style="text-align:center" | 2014
|style="text-align:center;"|
| 33 || 16 || 12 || 10 || 120 || 90 || 210 || 39 || 55 || 0.8 || 0.6 || 7.5 || 5.6 || 13.1 || 2.4 || 3.4 || 0
|-
! scope="row" style="text-align:center" | 2015
|style="text-align:center;"|
| 33 || 15 || 11 || 7 || 183 || 107 || 290 || 45 || 48 || 0.7 || 0.5 || 12.2 || 7.1 || 19.3 || 3.0 || 3.2 || 5
|- style="background-color: #EAEAEA"
! scope="row" style="text-align:center" | 2016
|style="text-align:center;"|
| 33 || 17 || 8 || 17 || 293 || 180 || 473 || 79 || 63 || 0.5 || 1.0 || 17.2 || 10.6 || 27.8 || 4.6 || 3.7 || 11
|-
! scope="row" style="text-align:center" | 2017
|style="text-align:center;"|
| 33 || 19 || 12 || 11 || 290 || 197 || 487 || 88 || 68 || 0.6 || 0.6 || 15.3 || 10.4 || 25.7 || 4.6 || 3.6 || 10
|- style="background-color: #EAEAEA"
! scope="row" style="text-align:center" | 2018
|style="text-align:center;"|
| 33 || 6 || 1 || 1 || 75 || 36 || 111 || 29 || 14 || 0.2 || 0.2 || 12.5 || 6.0 || 18.5 || 4.8 || 2.3 || 0
|-
! scope="row" style="text-align:center" | 2019
|style="text-align:center;"|North Melbourne
| 43 || 6 || 4 || 5 || 72 || 46 || 118 || 22 || 23 || 0.7 || 0.8 || 12.0 || 7.7 || 19.7 || 3.7 || 3.8 || 0
|-
|- style="background-color: #EAEAEA"
! scope="row" style="text-align:center" | 2020
|style="text-align:center;"|North Melbourne
| 43 || 15 || 10 || 14 || 134 || 85 || 219 || 47 || 36 || 0.7 || 0.9 || 8.9 || 5.7 || 14.6 || 3.1 || 2.4 || 1
|- style="background-color: #EAEAEA"
|-
! scope="row" style="text-align:center" | 2021
|style="text-align:center;"|North Melbourne
| 43 || 20 || 2 || 5 || 218 || 70 || 288 || 67 || 27 || 0.1 || 0.4 || 19.8 || 6.3 || 26.1 || 6.0 || 2.4 || 3
|- style="background-color: #EAEAEA"
|- 
! scope="row" style="text-align:center" | 2022
|style="text-align:center;"|North Melbourne
| 43 || 3 || 1 || 0 || 60 || 22 || 82 || 19 || 4 || 1 || 0 || 60 || 22 || 82 || 19 || 4 
|| TBA
|- 
|- class="sortbottom"
! colspan=3| Career
! 147
! 93
! 102
! 1724
! 969
! 2693
! 532
! 433
! 0.6
! 0.7
! 12.3
! 7.0
! 19.3
! 3.8
! 3.1
! 31
|}

References

External links

1990 births
Living people
Gold Coast Football Club players
Australian rules footballers from Tasmania
Hobart Football Club players
Australian people of I-Taukei Fijian descent
North Melbourne Football Club players